The 1939 Kansas City Monarchs baseball team represented the Kansas City Monarchs in the Negro American League (NAL) during the 1939 baseball season. The team compiled a 42–25 record and won the NAL pennant. 

The team featured three individuals who were later inducted into the Baseball Hall of Fame: manager/pitcher Andy Cooper, center fielder Turkey Stearnes, and left fielder Willard Brown. 

The team's leading batters were:
 Willard Brown - .368 batting average, .586 slugging percentage, 42 RBIs in 44 games
 Turkey Stearnes - .330 batting average, 503 slugging percentage, and 39 RBIs in 49 games
 Shortstop Ted Strong - .314 batting average

The team's leading pitchers were George Walker (8–1, 1.99 ERA) and Frank Bradley (7–4, 2.75 ERA).

References

1939 in sports in Missouri
Negro league baseball seasons
Kansas City Monarchs